John Boylan is a Canadian film and television actor, recently best known for his supporting roles as Gary Strange in Being Erica, Deputy Police Chief Talbot in Blue Murder and Bishop Richard Cushing in The Kennedys.

Early life
Boylan attended the National Theatre School of Canada.

Career
He has also appeared in the television series The Hitchhiker, Road to Avonlea, Side Effects, North of 60, Earth: Final Conflict, The City, Instant Star, The Newsroom and Queer as Folk, and the films Clearcut, Us Two, To Catch a Killer, Time to Say Goodbye? and The Path to 9/11.

Other work
Boylan works primarily as an acting teacher at Toronto, Ontario's Centre for the Arts, and has also taught acting at Ryerson University (now Toronto Metropolitan University), George Brown College, New York University, the University of Minnesota, the Yale School of Drama and York University.

He is the founder and Director of Toronto's Centre for the Arts. A graduate of Canada's National Theatre School, recent film and television credits include The Story of Luke, The Don Cherry Story, The Kennedys, and Servitude.

Filmography

Film

Television

References

External links

John Boylan bio at the Centre for the Arts

Year of birth missing (living people)
Living people
Canadian male television actors
Canadian male film actors
Drama teachers